The West Ice Shelf is a prominent ice shelf extending about  in an east–west direction along the Leopold and Astrid Coast in East Antarctica between Barrier Bay and Posadowsky Bay,  and up to 120 km northwards from the continental margin.

Discovery and naming
The ice shelf was discovered and named by the First German Antarctica Expedition, 1901–1903, under Dr Erich von Drygalski. The toponym describes the direction in which the German expedition first viewed the ice shelf. Their limited westward view became a prolonged one; on February 21, 1902, the ship became stuck in the pack ice, remaining imprisoned there until February 8, 1903.

Important Bird Area
A  site  on sea ice near the north-western margin of the shelf has been designated an Important Bird Area (IBA) by BirdLife International because it supports an emperor penguin colony.

See also
List of Antarctic ice shelves

References

External links

Erich von Drygalski

Important Bird Areas of Antarctica
Penguin colonies
Ice shelves of Antarctica
Bodies of ice of Princess Elizabeth Land